Stadion FK Baník Sokolov is a multi-purpose stadium in Sokolov, Czech Republic. It is mainly used for football matches and is the home ground of FK Baník Sokolov. The stadium holds 5,000 spectators, which, as of 2012, included 770 seated.

References

External links 
 Information at FK Baník Sokolov website
 Stadium information

Football venues in the Czech Republic
FK Baník Sokolov
Buildings and structures in the Karlovy Vary Region